Zuzana Roithová (born 30 January 1953) is a Czech politician and former Member of the European Parliament. She was vice-chair of the European Parliament's Committee on the Internal Market and Consumer Protection, a substitute on the Committee on Women's Rights and Gender Equality and a member of the Delegation for relations with the countries of Central America.

She was a candidate in Czech presidential election 2013. In the 1st round of the election held in January 2013, she placed 6th with 4,95% (255,045 votes). She didn't qualify for the second round.

Having previously served as Minister of Health, Senator and as Chair of the European Movement in the Czech Republic, she is a signatory of the Prague Declaration on European Conscience and Communism and a member of the Reconciliation of European Histories Group.

Personal life
Roithová lives in Dvory nad Lužnicí in the South Bohemian Region.

Education
 1978: Faculty of General Medicine, Charles University, Prague, Czech Republic.
 1997: Master of Business Administration, Sheffield Hallam University, UK.
 Certificate of Professional Development in Healthcare Management (Executive Education), The Wharton School of the University of Pennsylvania, USA.

Decorations
 1998: Charles University Jubilee Medal

Career
 1979–1992: Hospital doctor
 Head of Prague Faculty Hospital (1990–1998) and Chairwoman of the Czech Association of Hospitals
 1998: Minister of Health
 1998–2004: Senator
 Chairwoman of the Senate Committee on Health and Social Policy (2000–2002), member of the permanent delegation of the Czech Parliament to the WEU
 2000–2002: Chairwoman of the International European Movement in the Czech Republic
 2001–2003: Deputy Chairwoman of KDU-ČSL (Christian Democratic Union – Czechoslovak People's Party)

See also
 2004 European Parliament election in the Czech Republic

References

External links
 
 
 

Alumni of Sheffield Hallam University
1953 births
Living people
Physicians from Prague
Health ministers of the Czech Republic
MEPs for the Czech Republic 2004–2009
MEPs for the Czech Republic 2009–2014
KDU-ČSL MEPs
Women MEPs for the Czech Republic
Women government ministers of the Czech Republic
Members of the Senate of the Czech Republic
20th-century Czech women politicians
Candidates in the 2013 Czech presidential election
KDU-ČSL presidential candidates
Female candidates for President of the Czech Republic
Czech hospital administrators
Politicians from Prague
21st-century Czech women politicians
Charles University alumni